NGC 6061 is a lenticular galaxy with radio activity located about 490 million light-years away in the constellation Hercules. The galaxy is classified as a head-tail radio galaxy and was discovered by astronomer Lewis Swift on June 8, 1886. NGC 6061 is a member of the Hercules Cluster.

See also
 List of NGC objects (6001–7000)

References

External links

6061
57137
Hercules (constellation)
Hercules Cluster
Astronomical objects discovered in 1886
Lenticular galaxies
Radio galaxies
10199